Cardiff West is a  constituency represented in the House of Commons of the UK Parliament since 2001 by Kevin Brennan of the Labour Party.

History
A traditionally safe Labour seat, represented for 33 years by George Thomas (who became Speaker in 1976 and was re-elected without party affiliation in 1979). It has returned a Conservative only once, in the Tories' landslide year of 1983, when Stefan Terlezki became the MP.

Labour regained the seat at the next general election in 1987, when Rhodri Morgan was elected. After the creation of the Welsh Assembly Government, Morgan stepped down from his Westminster seat in 2001 to serve as leader of Welsh Labour and First Minister for Wales. Kevin Brennan retained the seat for Labour on Morgan's retirement from Westminster politics and has remained the MP ever since.

Boundaries

1950–1974: The County Borough of Cardiff wards of Canton, Ely, Grangetown, Llandaff, and Riverside.

1974–1983: The County Borough of Cardiff wards of Canton, Ely, Llandaff, Plasmawr, and Riverside.

1983–2010: The City of Cardiff wards of Caerau, Canton, Ely, Fairwater, Llandaff, Radyr and St Fagans, and Riverside.

2010–present: The Cardiff electoral divisions of Caerau, Canton, Creigiau and St Fagans, Ely, Fairwater, Llandaff, Pentyrch, Radyr, and Riverside.

Cardiff West is entirely within the boundaries of the city of Cardiff, taking up the northwestern quarter of the borough at the boundaries of the boroughs of Rhondda Cynon Taf and Vale of Glamorgan. Population areas within the constituency include Riverside, Pontcanna, St Fagans and Ely. There are some Conservative-voting areas in the north of the seat such as Creigiau and St Fagans, Pentyrch and Radyr, but the bulk of the seat comprises districts towards the centre of Cardiff such as Caerau, Canton, Ely and Riverside which are very strongly Labour.

Members of Parliament

Elections

Elections in the 1950s

Elections in the 1960s

Elections in the 1970s

Elections in the 1980s

Elections in the 1990s

Elections in the 2000s

Elections in the 2010s

Of the 113 rejected ballots:
80 were either unmarked or it was uncertain who the vote was for.
30 voted for more than one candidate.
3 had writing or a mark by which the voter could be identified.

Of the 89 rejected ballots:
66 were either unmarked or it was uncertain who the vote was for.
23 voted for more than one candidate.

Of the 144 rejected ballots:
115 were either unmarked or it was uncertain who the vote was for.
28 voted for more than one candidate.
1 had writing or mark by which the voter could be identified.

See also
 Cardiff West (Senedd constituency)
 List of parliamentary constituencies in South Glamorgan
 List of parliamentary constituencies in Wales

Notes

References

External links
nomis Constituency Profile for Cardiff West – presenting data from the ONS annual population survey and other official statistics.
Politics Resources (Election results from 1922 onwards)
Electoral Calculus (Election results from 1955 onwards)
2017 Election House Of Commons Library 2017 Election report
A Vision Of Britain Through Time (Constituency elector numbers)

Parliamentary constituencies in South Wales
Constituencies of the Parliament of the United Kingdom established in 1950
Politics of Cardiff